De La Salle School is a Roman Catholic voluntary aided school located in Basildon, Essex for boys and girls aged 11 to 16, in the Trusteeship of the La Sallian Brothers, and within the Diocese of Brentwood.

History
The school was founded in September 1972 as St Anselm's Roman Catholic Secondary School, the first comprehensive secondary school in the district of Basildon established after the tripartite system was no longer implemented in Essex. Its name was changed to De La Salle School in 1996, after the French priest and educator Jean-Baptiste de la Salle. The school was awarded Language College specialist status in 2008.

See also
La Sallian educational institutions

References

External links
School Website

Secondary schools in Essex
Borough of Basildon
Catholic secondary schools in the Diocese of Brentwood
Essex
Voluntary aided schools in England
Educational institutions established in 1972
1972 establishments in England